John Coles may refer to:

John David Coles, film and television director
John Coles (historian) (1930–2020), British archaeologist
John Coles (diplomat) (born 1937), former British High Commissioner to Australia
John Coles (businessman) (1833–1919), English businessman
John Coles (bowls) (1892–1972), English bowls player
Johnny Coles (1926–1997), American jazz musician

See also
John Cole's Book Shop, San Diego, California
John Cole (disambiguation)